Vladimir Golmak (born 11 October 1966) is a Belarusian football coach and former player. He is currently the head coach of Shakhtyor Soligorsk's U19 team.

Coaching career
In 2017 he was a head coach at Belshina Bobruisk.

Honours
MPKC Mozyr
Belarusian Premier League champion: 1996
Belarusian Cup winner: 1995–96

References

External links
 Profile at teams.by
 Profile at pressball.by
 Profile at Soccerway
 Vladimir Golmak at Footballdatabase

1966 births
Living people
People from Babruysk
Belarusian footballers
Association football defenders
FC Dnepr Mogilev players
FC Belshina Bobruisk players
FC Slavia Mozyr players
FC Torpedo Minsk players
Belarusian football managers
FC SKVICH Minsk managers
FC Kommunalnik Slonim managers
FC Gomel managers
FC Dinamo Minsk managers
FC Belshina Bobruisk managers
FC UAS Zhitkovichi managers
Sportspeople from Mogilev Region